The 2022 FIBA U20 European Championship Division B was the 16th edition of the Division B of the European basketball championship for national under-20 teams. It was played from 15 to 24 July 2022 in Tbilisi, Georgia. Serbia men's national under-20 basketball team won the tournament.

Participating teams 

  (16th place, 2019 FIBA U20 European Championship Division A)

  (14th place, 2019 FIBA U20 European Championship Division A), moved to Division A

  (15th place, 2019 FIBA U20 European Championship Division A)

First round
The draw of the first round was held on 15 February 2022 in Freising, Germany.

In the first round, the teams were drawn into four groups. The first two teams from each group advance to the quarterfinals; the third and fourth teams advance to the 9th–16th place playoffs; the other teams will play in the 17th–19th place classification group.

Group A

Group B

Group C

Group D

17th−19th place classification

Group E

9th−16th place playoffs

9th–16th place quarterfinals

13th–16th place semifinals

9th–12th place semifinals

15th place match

13th place match

11th place match

9th place match

Championship playoffs

Quarterfinals

5th–8th place semifinals

Semifinals

7th place match

5th place match

3rd place match

Final

Final standings

See also
 2022 FIBA U20 European Championship Division A

References

External links
Official website

FIBA U20 European Championship Division B
2022–23 in European basketball
International basketball competitions hosted by Georgia (country)
FIBA U20
July 2022 sports events in Europe
Sports competitions in Tbilisi